Konstantinos Kapoutaglis (born 1 July 1996) is a Greek professional footballer who plays as a goalkeeper for Gamma Ethniki club Panionios.

References

1996 births
Living people
Greece youth international footballers
Football League (Greece) players
Gamma Ethniki players
Super League Greece 2 players
Panachaiki F.C. players
Association football goalkeepers
Footballers from Athens
Greek footballers